White Acacia is a 1957 Soviet comedy film directed by Georgy Natanson.

Plot 
The film tells about the girl Tonya, who dreams of traveling by sea and is in love with the captain of the whaling ship Konstantin Kupriyanov, who in turn is in love with Larisa, for whom having fun is the main thing.

Cast 
 Idaliya Ivanova as Tosya Chumakova
 Aleksandr Starodub as Kostya Kupriyanov
 Yevheniya Dembska as Larisa
 Mikhail Vodyanoy as Yashka 'Buksir'
 Nikolay Kochkin as Pyotr Timofeyevich Chumakov
 Valentina Franchuk as Olga Ivanovna
 Muza Krepkogorskaya as Katya
 Mikhail Dashevskiy as Korablyov
 Sheva Fingerova as Serafima Stepanovna
 Oleg Shapovalov as Lyosha
 Boris Nikitin as Sasha	
 Viktor Aloin as Zhenya Morgunov
 Leonid Marennikov as Film Director (uncredited)

References

External links 
 

1957 films
1950s Russian-language films